Cicchetti is an Italian surname. Notable people with the surname include:

 Antonio Cicchetti (born 1952), Italian politician
 Charles Cicchetti, American professor of economics
 Dante Cicchetti, American psychologist
 Joseph J. Cicchetti (1923–1945), American soldier

Italian-language surnames